The 2021–22 Thai League 1 is the 25th season of the Thai League 1, the top Thai professional league for association football clubs, since its establishment in 1996, also known as Hilux Revo Thai League due to the sponsorship deal with Toyota Motor Thailand. A total of 16 teams will compete in the league. The season began on 31 July 2021 and is scheduled to conclude in May 2022.

The 1st transfer window is from 4 May to 27 July 2021 while the 2nd transfer window is from 8 December 2021 to 4 January 2022.

BG Pathum United are the defending champions, while Nongbua Pitchaya, Chiangmai United and  Khonkaen United have entered as the promoted teams from the 2020–21 Thai League 2.

Changes from last season

Team changes

Promoted clubs
Promoted from the 2020–21 Thai League 2
 Nongbua Pitchaya
 Chiangmai United
 Khonkaen United

Relegated clubs
Relegated from the 2020–21 Thai League 1
 Rayong
 Sukhothai
 Trat

Teams

There are 16 clubs in the league, with three promoted teams from Thai League 2 replacing the three teams that were relegated from the 2020-21 season.

Sukhothai, Trat and Rayong were relegated at the end of the 2020–21 season after finishing in the bottom three places of the table. They were replaced by 2020-21 Thai League 2 champions Nongbua Pitchaya. They were joined by runners-up Chiangmai United, who also got promoted for the first time and Khonkaen United, promotion playoff winner which was first held in 2020–21 season.

Stadium and locations

Note: Table lists in alphabetical order.

Personnel and sponsoring
Note: Flags indicate national team as has been defined under FIFA eligibility rules. Players may hold more than one non-FIFA nationality.

Managerial changes

Foreign players
The FIFA Transfer Window Period for Thailand was 4 May 2021 to 24 July 2021.

League table

Positions by round

Results by match played

Results

Season statistics

Top scorers
As of 4 May 2022.

Top assists
As of 4 May 2022.

Hat-tricks 

Notes
4 Player scored 4 goals

Clean sheets
As of 4 May 2022.

Awards

Monthly awards

Season awards

Attendances

Overall statistical table

Attendances by home match played

Source: Thai League

See also
 2021–22 Thai League 2
 2021–22 Thai League 3
 2022 Thailand Amateur League
 2021–22 Thai FA Cup
 2021–22 Thai League Cup
 2021 Thailand Champions Cup

Notes

References

2021
2021–22 in Asian association football leagues
2021 in Thai football leagues